The Kampung Dato Harun Komuter station is a commuter train station located in Petaling Jaya, Selangor near PJS 2 Flyover New Pantai Expressway Bangsar bount, and served by the Port Klang Line.

The Kampung Dato Harun station located in Section 51 of Petaling Jaya and was built to cater the traffic there and named after the Malay village nearby, Kampung Dato Harun.

The Komuter station usually busy during rush hours as it is used by worker to reach their offices. It is also used by factory workers as many factories are situated in this area. A few of those factories are Continental Sime Tyre Sdn Bhd, Nestle Manufacturing (M) Sdn Bhd, Sapura Resources Bhd, etc. Taman Medan Jaya and Desa Mentari (Ph.4) are the residential properties nearest to this station.

Name
This station was named MAHA Lama Station in the 1980s.

References

External links
 Kampung Dato Harun KTM Komuter Station

Railway stations in Selangor
Rapid transit stations in Selangor
Port Klang Line